Mahabat Khan (full title Mahabat Khan Khan-e-Khanan Sipah-Salar Zamana Beg Kabuli), born Zamana Beg (died 1634), was a prominent Mughal general and statesman, perhaps best known for his coup against the Mughal Emperor Jahangir in 1626. He also served Subahdar of Malwa Subah from 1611 to 1623 and Bengal Subah during 1625–1626. He earned the title Khan-i-Khanan from emperor Shah Jahan.

Early life
Born Zamana Beg, Khan's father was Ghiwar Beg Kabuli who came from Shiraz to Kabul and subsequently to India.

Career in the Mughal Army
Upon entering the Mughal service, Zamana Beg enjoyed a rapid ascent through the ranks of the Mughal army. He began his military career in the personal forces of Crown Prince Salim (who later went on to become Emperor Jahangir). Having endeared himself to the crown prince, he was soon made an officer in charge of 500 men. Prince Salim sent him to Malik Ambar to remove the campaign of Prince Daniyal in the Deccan. He also led Salim’s army during the Rajputana campaign in Mewar. Mahabat Khan was gifted a concubine from Mewar; she died in childbirth.

Upon Jahangir's rise to the throne in 1605, he was granted the honorific title Mahabat Khan, and was promoted to the rank of commander of 1,500 men, and bakhshi (treasurer) of the emperor's private privy purse.  Mahabat Khan rose to prominence in 1623, when he was made commander of the Mughal forces sent to defeat the unsuccessful rebellion of Prince Khurram (who later went on to become Emperor Shah Jahan) in the Deccan.  For his loyal service, he was recognised as a 'pillar of the state', and was ultimately promoted to chief commander of the Mughal army, with a personal force of 7,000 men.

Rebellion
Mahabat Khan's success in quelling Prince Khurram's rebellion was not met with pleasure by many members of the Mughal court, who began to fear and resent the general's growing prestige and influence.  Empress Nur Jahan was especially concerned, and in an effort to curb Mahabat Khan's rising power, she arranged to have him made governor of Bengal, a province far removed from the Mughal capital at Lahore. Furthermore, in an effort to humiliate him in the imperial court, Nur Jahan had him charged with disloyal conduct and ordered him to return to Lahore to face trial. As a result of Nur Jahan's machinations against him, Mahabat Khan decided to take action, and so in 1626, he led an army of loyal Rajput soldiers to the Punjab.  He had also brought the wives and families of many of them, so that, if driven to extremity, they would fight to the last for the lives and honour of themselves and their families . Meanwhile, Jahangir and his retinue were preparing to head to Kabul, and were encamped on the banks of the River Jhelum.  Mahabat Khan and his forces attacked the royal encampment, and successfully took the emperor hostage; Nur Jahan, however, managed to escape.  Mahabat Khan declared himself emperor of India at Kabul, however his success was short-lived.

Nur Jahan, with the help of nobles who were still loyal to Jahangir, came up with a plan to free her husband.  She surrendered herself to Mahabat Khan, and once reunited with her husband, put her plan into action. She had Jahangir convince Mahabat Khan that he was satisfied with the current arrangement, as it had freed him from her clutches. Mahabat Khan believed that he had won over the former emperor, failing to realise that Jahangir was in fact siding with Nur Jahan. Consequently, he decreased the Rajput guards that he had placed around Jahangir, and prepared to return to Lahore with the captive emperor.  Meanwhile, Nur Jahan arranged for an army to meet them en route to Lahore; in the ensuing battle, Nur Jahan's forces were victorious, and Jahangir was freed from captivity. Mahabat Khan with the help of Raja Nathu Mall of Majhauli  settled the remaining wounded Rajputs and their family in the forests of Gorakhpur, Uttar Pradesh. Thus Mahabat Khan's brief reign lasted approximately 100 days.

Later life and death
Following his unsuccessful coup, Khan fled to the Deccan. There, Prince Khurram convinced him to surrender himself to Jahangir. However, with the death of Jahangir shortly thereafter in October 1627, Khan went unpunished.  Upon Prince Khurram's rise to the throne as Emperor Shah Jahan, Mahabat Khan was appointed governor of Ajmer.  He was later transferred to a post in the Deccan, where he died in 1634. His body was carried back to Delhi, where he was buried on the ground of the shrine of Qadam Sharif. Upon death, his eldest son, Mirza Amanullah, was awarded the title 'Khan Zaman', while his second son, Luhrasp, was granted his late father's title, Mahabat Khan.

References

1634 deaths
Subahdars of Bengal
Mughal generals
Year of birth unknown